Kribbella sancticallisti is a species of bacteria in the genus Kribbella. It was discovered as a whitish-grey patina growing in Roman catacombs in 2008.

See also
 Kribbella catacumbae
 Rubrobacter—found in catacombs (see Catacombs#Bacteria)

References

External links
Type strain of Kribbella sancticallisti at BacDive -  the Bacterial Diversity Metadatabase

Propionibacteriales